Laifeng County is a county of southwestern Hubei province, People's Republic of China. It is under the administration of the  Enshi Tujia and Miao Autonomous Prefecture.

Administrative divisions
Six towns:
Xiangfeng, Baifusi, Dahe, Lüshui (formerly Lüshui Township ), Jiusi (formerly Jiusi Township ), Geleche (formerly Geleche Township

Two townships:
Manshui Township, Sanhu Township

Climate

References

Counties of Hubei
Enshi Tujia and Miao Autonomous Prefecture